Story Tweedie-Yates (born May 2, 1983) is an American former tennis player. Her career-high singles ranking is world No. 319, which she reached in October 2006. Her career-high doubles ranking is No. 189, set in May 2009.

Early life
Tweedie-Yates, who grew up in Redmond, Washington, studied psychology at Stanford University from 2001 to 2005. She then focused on a career as a tennis player. Overall, she won two singles and eight doubles titles on the ITF Women's Circuit. In August 2011, she retired from professional tennis.

ITF Circuit finals

Singles: 4 (2–2)

Doubles: 15 (8–7)

References

External links
 
 

1983 births
Living people
American female tennis players
Tennis people from Washington (state)
21st-century American women
Stanford Cardinal women's tennis players